Gerald "Soupy" Campbell (July 14, 1944 – August 9, 2017) was a professional football player, a linebacker in the Canadian Football League for the Calgary Stampeders (1966–1968) and the Ottawa Rough Riders (1968–1975).

Early years
Born in Binghamton, New York, Campbell played high school football for the Lewis and Clark Tigers in Spokane, Washington, and graduated in 1962.

At Idaho, he was a roommate of future major league pitcher Bill Stoneman. Tired of spring football practice, Campbell tried out for the Vandal baseball team in 1965 on a whim and made the team as a back-up catcher and outfielder.

Canadian Football League

Calgary
Campbell started his CFL career with the Calgary Stampeders in 1966.

Ottawa
During his third year in the CFL, Campbell became a member of the Ottawa Rough Riders via a trade during the 1968 season. As an outside linebacker, he played next to middle linebacker Ken Lehmann up to 1971 and behind defensive end Billy Joe Booth up to 1970.

He was a savvy and quick linebacker, rarely blowing his assignment. As a result, Campbell was a CFL All-Star for seven straight years (1969–1975) for the Rough Riders and played a significant part on three Grey Cup championship teams for them, in 1968, 1969, and 1973.

Calgary: second time around
Campbell finished his CFL career where he started, in Calgary, but played only 2 games with the team in 1976.

Post-football honors
For his high level of play and consistency over many years, Campbell was inducted into the Canadian Football Hall of Fame in 1996.

Death
Campbell died of a heart attack on August 9, 2017 in Toronto, aged 73. He also had Alzheimer’s disease in his later years.

References

External links
 Canadian Football Hall of Fame member

1944 births
2017 deaths
Calgary Stampeders players
Canadian Football Hall of Fame inductees
Canadian football linebackers
Idaho Vandals football players
Ottawa Rough Riders players
Sportspeople from Binghamton, New York